The 2020 Al Habtoor Tennis Challenge was a women's professional tennis tournament played on outdoor hard courts. It was the twenty-third edition of the tournament which was part of the 2020 ITF Women's World Tennis Tour. It took place in Dubai, United Arab Emirates between 7 and 13 December 2020.

Singles main-draw entrants

Seeds

 1 Rankings are as of 30 November 2020.

Other entrants
The following players received wildcards into the singles main draw:
  Jodie Burrage
  Dalma Gálfi
  Ana Konjuh
  Ankita Raina

The following players received entry from the qualifying draw:
  Elisabetta Cocciaretto
  Jaqueline Cristian
  Mika Dagan Fruchtman
  Magdalena Fręch
  Ekaterine Gorgodze
  Aleksandra Krunić
  Elena-Gabriela Ruse
  Anna Karolína Schmiedlová

The following players received entry into the singles main draw as lucky losers:
  Amina Anshba
  Viktorija Golubic
  Lesley Pattinama Kerkhove

Champions

Singles

 Sorana Cîrstea def.  Kateřina Siniaková, 4–6, 6–3, 6–3

Doubles

 Ekaterine Gorgodze /  Ankita Raina def.  Aliona Bolsova /  Kaja Juvan, 6–4, 3–6, [10–6]

References

External links
 2020 Al Habtoor Tennis Challenge at ITFtennis.com
 Official website

2020 ITF Women's World Tennis Tour
2020 in Emirati tennis
December 2020 sports events in Asia
Al Habtoor Tennis Challenge